Bligh Island Marine Provincial Park is a provincial park in British Columbia, Canada.

The park encompasses several islands in Nootka Sound, including Bligh Island, the Villaverde Islands, and the Pantoja Islands.

See also
William Bligh

References

External links
Bligh Island Marine Provincial Park - BC Parks site.
 (map)

Provincial parks of British Columbia
Nootka Sound region
1995 establishments in British Columbia
Marine parks of Canada